Dom Pedro de Alcântara of Orléans-Braganza, Prince of Grão Pará (15 October 1875 – 29 January 1940) was the first-born son of Dona Isabel, Princess Imperial of Brazil and Prince Gaston of Orléans, Count of Eu, and as such, was born second-in-line to the imperial throne of Brazil, during the reign of his grandfather, Emperor Dom Pedro II, until the empire's abolition. He went into exile in Europe with his mother when his grandfather was deposed in 1889, and grew up largely in France, at a family apartment in Boulogne-sur-Seine, and at his father's castle, the Château d'Eu in Normandy.

Early life

Pedro was born on 15 October 1875 in the Imperial Palace of Petrópolis. He was the first son of Isabel, Princess Imperial of Brazil and her husband Prince Gaston, Count of Eu. As first son of the heiress to the throne, he was entitled Prince of Grão-Pará and was the presumptive heir to the Brazilian throne at his birth.

Pedro was educated by preceptors, headed by the Baron of Ramiz, and lived in the Isabel Palace, in Rio de Janeiro with his younger brothers until The proclamation of the republic, on 15 November 1889, when he was fourteen years old. One of his most poignant gestures on the occasion of the departure of the Brazilian imperial family to exile was when he suggested to his grandfather Emperor Pedro II "the idea of letting go a white dove on the high seas, which would take the last missive of the Brazilian imperial family." The family signed a message and then attached it to a dove, which was released at the highest point of Fernando de Noronha. However, the dove ended up falling to the sea without fulfilling its purpose.

Exile

During the exile in 1890, Pedro moved along with their parents to the outskirts of Versailles. He reached the age of majority in 1893, and without desire to assume the monarchist cause, he left for Vienna, capital of the Austro-Hungarian Empire, to study in the military school at Wiener Neustadt. According to his own mother it was "clear that he must do something and a military career seems to us the only one he should follow". His younger brothers Luís and Antônio followed him at the same military school. Pedro was formed as Lieutenant of the Austro-Hungarian Army at the 4th Regiment of Uhlans and was later Captain on the reserve.

In 1900 Pedro met Countess Elisabeth Dobržensky de Dobrženicz, a noblewoman of the Austro-Hungarian Empire, daughter of Johann-Wenzel, Count Dobrzensky von Dobrzenicz, who came from a former noble family of Bohemia, and Elizabeth, Baroness Kottulin und Krzischkowitz and Countess Kottulinsky. Count Dobrzensky von Dobrzenicz was elevated to the nobility title of count in 1906, at the request of Princess Isabel, until then his ancestors had been barons. After eight years of courtship and engagement, they married in Versailles, France, on 14 November 1908. The couple had five children.

Restoration attempts

With the deposition of Pedro II of Brazil and the departure of the imperial family to the exile, rumors and even initiatives for the restoration appeared, occasionally. In 1893, the republic staggered with the second revolt of the navy and the federalist revolution in the south of the country. The leader of this last movement, Gaspar Silveira Martins, avowedly monarchist, was engaged in conspiracies to restore the parliamentary monarchy in Brazil. He had already insisted in vain that Pedro II should return to the country, after Marshal Deodoro had closed the National Congress. With the advance of the revolution, he proposed to Princess Isabel to allow the soldiers linked to the Army Revolt to take their eldest son, Pedro, Prince of Grão-Pará, to be acclaimed Dom Pedro III. He heard from the princess that "first of all she was a Catholic, and as such she could not leave the Brazilians with the education of her son, whose soul he had to save". Outraged, Silveira Martins replied: "So, madam, his fate is the convent."

The House of Orléans-Braganza did not prepare itself to the risks of a bloody adventure in the south of Brazil. If, on the one hand, the Prince Imperial had given a revolution that had men and arms a soul, on the other hand, he spared himself the sad end of Custódio José de Melo, Gumercindo Saraiva, and so many others who measured forces against the republic.

Renunciation
In 1908 Dom Pedro wanted to marry Countess Elisabeth Dobržensky de Dobrženicz (1875–1951) who, although a noblewoman of the Kingdom of Bohemia, did not belong to a royal or reigning dynasty. Although the constitution of the Brazilian Empire did not require a dynast to marry equally, his mother ruled that the marriage would not be valid dynastically for the Brazilian succession, and as a result he renounced his rights to the defunct throne of Brazil on 30 October 1908. To solemnize this, Dom Pedro, aged thirty-three, signed the document translated here:

This renunciation was followed by a letter from Isabel to royalists in Brazil:

Nonetheless, a few years before his death Prince Pedro de Alcântara told a Brazilian newspaper:
"My resignation was not valid for many reasons: besides, it was not a hereditary resignation."

But years later he had rectified his position:

It is there that I intend to recover the rights of eventual succession to the throne of Brazil, with prejudice to d. Pedro Henrique, my nephew, denying my resignation in 1908. My resignation in 1908 is valid, although many monarchists ... understood that, politically and by the Brazilian laws in force in 1889, it must be ratified by the should the monarchy be restored. In fact, in my family there will never be dissensions or disputes over imperial power.

Death of the Princess Imperial
After the death of the Princess Imperial in 1921, the deceased Dom Luiz's son, Prince Pedro Henrique of Orléans-Braganza, assumed the position of claimant to the Brazilian throne and was recognized as such by many of Europe's dynasties. After Dom Pedro de Alcântara's death in 1940 his eldest son, Prince Pedro Gastão of Orléans-Braganza, asserted a counter-claim as the proper successor (garnering the support of his brothers-in-law, the pretenders to the thrones of Orléanist France and Miguelist Portugal), and some Brazilian legal scholars subsequently argued that his father's renunciation would, indeed, have been constitutionally invalid under the monarchy. Although Pedro de Alcântara's daughter, Princess Isabel, is said to have referred to Dom Pedro Gastão as "My brother, the Brazilian Emperor", she acknowledged in her memoirs that their father nonetheless regarded his renunciation as binding, and treated it as effective.

Return to Brazil

Dom Pedro, after the decree exiling the imperial family was rescinded, came to Brazil to make hunting excursions in the Brazilian backlands. Accompanied by his secretary, he made between 1926 and 1927 one of the best-known trips of the time: the "auto-raid" from Bolivia to Rio de Janeiro, traveling four thousand kilometers by car on practically impassable roads. From this expedition there are reports published by Mario Baldi in Brazilian and European illustrated newspapers and magazines. Many photographs were made at the time; The images are part of the collection Mario Baldi, the secretary of culture of Teresópolis, city where the Austrian lived. Another expedition was made by the prince and his secretary, this time with the children of D. Pedro, in 1936.

On this occasion the expeditionaries visited indigenous villages of the Brazilian backwoods. The magazine A Noite Illustrada published several reports and photographs of Mario Baldi, who did the documentation of the adventure again. D. Pedro de Alcântara returned to Brazil in the decade of 1930, establishing itself in the Grão-Pará Palace, in Petrópolis. He became an obligatory figure in local celebrations and achievements, being greatly admired by the warm and friendly manner in which he always addressed his compatriots. In that same city the prince died, at 64 years of age, the victim of a respiratory illness, and was buried in the local cemetery with honors of head of state. In 1990, his remains were transferred along with his wife to the Imperial Mausoleum in the Cathedral of St. Peter of Alcantara in Petropolis, where they lie next to the tombs of their parents and grandparents in a simple vault.

Honors
Prince Pedro de Alcântara was a recipient of the following Brazilian dynastic orders:
 Grand Cross of the Order of Pedro I
 Grand Cross of the Order of the Rose
 Grand Cross of the Order of the Southern Cross

He was a recipient of the following foreign honors:
 Grand Cordon of the Order of the Rising Sun (Japan)

Issue
Pedro and Elisabeth married on 14 November 1908 in Versailles, France, and had 5 children :

 Princess Isabelle of Orléans-Braganza (1911–2003) married Henri, Count of Paris - grandparents of Prince Jean, Duke of Vendôme (born 1965), the current Orleanist pretender to the throne of France.
 Prince Pedro Gastão of Orléans-Braganza (1913–2007) married Princess Maria de la Esperanza of Bourbon-Two Sicilies - parents of Princess Maria da Gloria, Duchess of Segorbe, the last Crown Princess of Yugoslavia.
 Princess Maria Francisca of Orléans-Braganza (1914–1968) married Duarte Nuno, Duke of Braganza - parents of Duarte Pio, Duke of Braganza, the current pretender to the throne of Portugal.
 Prince João Maria of Orléans-Braganza (1916–2005) married Fatima Sherifa Chirine (1923-1990), widow of Prince Hassan Toussoun of Egypt.
 Princess Teresa of Orléans-Braganza (1919–2011) married Ernesto António Maria Martorell y Calderó (1921-1985).

After his death his son Prince Pedro Gastão assumed the headship of the Petrópolis branch of the Imperial House of Brazil.

Ancestry

References

Sources
Article about Elisabeth Dobrzensky published in Royal Digest

|-

|-

|-

1875 births
1940 deaths
House of Orléans-Braganza
Princes of Grão-Pará
People from Petrópolis
Burials at the Imperial Mausoleum at the Cathedral of Petrópolis